2009 FAM League is the 57th edition season of current third-tier league competition in Malaysia. The league is called TM Malaysia FAM League for sponsorship reason.

The league winner for 2009 season is Pos Malaysia FC.

Teams

The following teams participated in the Malaysia FAM Cup 2009. In order by the number given by FAM:-

 1  Penjara F.C.
 2  KSK Tambun Tulang FC
 3  Pos Malaysia FC
 4  KSB Juara Ban Hoe Leong FC
 5  UiTM F.C. 
 6  Universiti Sains Malaysia Staff F.C.
 7  MP Muar FC, 
 8  Melodi Jaya Sports Club

Team summaries

Stadia

League table

References

3
2009